Ga (also known as Ganda, Ga'andu, Mokar, Makwar) is an Afro-Asiatic language spoken by about 500,000 people in the Gombi Local Government Area in Adamawa state of Nigeria.  Many speakers live across the length and breadth of Nigeria.  It has three dialects, Ga'anda, Gabun and Boga; Blench (2006) classifies Gabun is a separate language.  Its speakers are generally not monolingual in Ga'anda, instead, they use Hausa, Lala, Hona, Kilba, Fulfulde, and Bura. Ga'anda has a rich cultural heritage, its natives are very hospitable people. 70% of its population are Christians, 20% Muslims and 10% Traditionalists.

Blench (2019) lists Kaɓәn and Fәrtata as Ga’anda varieties.

Notes

References
 World Atlas of Language Structures entry for Ga'anda
 Roxana Ma Newman.  1971.  "A Case Grammar of Ga'anda," University of California at Los Angeles PhD dissertation.

Biu-Mandara languages
Languages of Nigeria